The Val d'Agri oil field is an oil field located in the region of the Southern Apennines. It was discovered in 1991 and developed by Eni. It began production in 1996 and  produces oil.

Eni is the operator in Basilicata of the Val d’Agri permit (60.77% owned by Eni), which in 2008 produced  equivalent ( equivalent net to Eni).

References

Oil fields in Italy